Mr Firecul is a 2004 British short film starring footballer David Ginola.

Synopsis
Mr Firecul is a short film about the Devil trying to re-brand himself. He approaches one top public relations experts for a makeover. The only problem is he isn't dead yet.

Background
Mr Firecul is an anagram of Mr Lucifer. The film was written by Jade Carmen and Louis Paltnoi. The film was produced by Louis Paltnoi, and the production company was Jinx Films. Mr Firecul had its London premiere at the Odeon Covent Garden on 5 August 2004. The film was acquired for television distribution in the UK and its first broadcast premiere was in 2005.

Cast
 David Ginola as Mr. Firecul
 Michael Brown as Jason Collridge
 Chris Ryman as Sam
 Rebecca Kenyon	as Sandra
 Jack Knight as Mr. Gray	
 Pauline Hardy as Neighbour
 Rojer Weightman as Policeman 1
 David Garry as Policeman 2
 Lauren Gold as Model 1
 Kasey Wynter as Model 2
 Manolita Bernal as Model 3
 Udias Dos Santos as Dancer 1
 Allen Kaheja as Dancer 2
 Yaritza Sojo Foucaud as Dancer 3
 Anisha Shah as  Dancer 4

References

British short films
2004 films
2004 short films
2000s English-language films